The Nokia 6300 is a mobile telephone handset produced by Nokia. It was announced on 28 November 2006 and released in January 2007. This model was assembled in several factories, including Jucu plant, near Cluj, in Romania.

The Nokia 6300 is a mid-ranger combining a classic candybar design with a durable stainless steel and slim (11.7 mm thick) body. It runs on Series 40. The 6300 was a hit and became one of the top-selling Nokia models on the market during its time. Slightly improved models Nokia 6301 and Nokia 6300i were launched later in 2007 and 2008 respectively.

The 6300 was considered to have been the successor of several models, including 6230i and 6310i.

Features 

The phone supports MicroSD cards up to 2 GB (4 GB with the 6300i variant), meaning that the phone can be used practically as an MP3 player. Using the supplied and freely available Nokia PC Suite, one can convert all the MP3 files in a music library to e-AAC in order to fit more on the card. The 2.5 mm headphone jack means that few commercial headsets will fit the phone, however there are adapters available enabling the use of headphones with a standard jack.

Like most other new Nokia phones, the 6300 eschews their old Pop-Port connector for a standard mini-USB connector. At the launch many questioned why to include the USB port for data, but not for charging. Nokia's support for USB was desired, but slipped to a later release.

The phone also has two slow flashing lights on the side, to show missed calls or messages. This feature is an update of the reminder light in the 6060 fold phone that did not have an external display

With firmware version 06.01 and later, Nokia 6300 is capable of playing MPEG-4 (*.mp4) files with a QCIF resolution of 176*144 at 25 frames per second. The phone allows the user to view the video clips in full-screen landscape mode and set the fast-forward/rewind interval from a few seconds to minutes. Improved audio quality for music playback was also noted for this firmware version, thus making the Nokia 6300 a music phone similar to its counterparts, the Nokia XpressMusic. In addition, video clips can replace ringtones so that an actual motion picture is shown while there is an incoming call.

Popularity and reception
Nokia 6300 was a highly popular mobile phone handset throughout the world, officially the best-selling Nokia handset in 2007. A report from The Economist said that Nokia 6300 was the most popular handset in Africa as of the beginning of 2011, four years after the original release.

Reviewers of the handset generally praised the build quality and feature set. Reviewer S21 called it "our favourite Nokia phone for a long time", praising the user friendliness and metallic design.

The 6300 was succeeded by the Nokia 6303 classic and Nokia 6700 classic.

Nokia 6300i
The Nokia 6300i is an upgraded version of the Nokia 6300 with the same design but adding Wireless LAN and VoIP capability and support for 4GB microSD cards (the 6300 could only support up to 2GB microSD cards). It was announced on 26 March 2008. The device is designed for typical use in Europe and only distributed there.

Specification sheet

References

External links

Nokia 6300 Product page 

Mobile phones introduced in 2006
6300